The Crimson Curtain is a 1953 French short film directed by Alexandre Astruc. It was screened at the 1952 Cannes Film Festival, but not entered into the competition.

Plot
A young military officer is a tenant in the house of wealthy citizens. He admires their daughter, who eventually makes his dreams come true by spending the night with him. They have a secret love affair. But as surprisingly as she indulged him, she dies in his arms. Desperate, the officer rides away.

Cast
 Anouk Aimée as Albertine
 Marguerite Garcya as Albertine's mother
 Jim Gérald as Albertine's father
 Jean-Claude Pascal as the officer

References

External links

1953 films
1953 short films
1950s French-language films
French short films
French black-and-white films
Louis Delluc Prize winners
Films based on works by Jules Barbey d'Aurevilly
Films directed by Alexandre Astruc
1950s French films